Parnisini is a tribe of cicadas in the family Cicadidae. There are more than 20 genera and 80 described species in Parnisini, found in the Neotropics, Palearctic, tropical Africa and Madagascar.

Genera
The following genera belong to the tribe Parnisini:

 Abagazara Distant, 1905
 Acyroneura Torres, 1958
 Adeniana Distant, 1905
 Arcystasia Distant, 1882
 Bijaurana Distant, 1912
 Calopsaltria Stål, 1861
 Calyria Stål, 1862
 Crassisternalna Boulard, 1980
 Derotettix Berg, 1882
 Henicotettix Stål, 1858
 Jafuna Distant, 1912
 Kageralna Boulard, 2012
 Koranna Distant, 1905
 Luangwana Distant, 1914
 Lycurgus China, 1925
 Malgotilia Boulard, 1980
 Mapondera Distant, 1905
 Masupha Distant, 1892
 Parnisa Stål, 1862
 Prunasis Stål, 1862
 Psilotympana Stål, 1861
 Rhinopsalta Melichar, 1908
 Taipinga Distant, 1905
 Zouga Distant, 1906

References

Further reading

 
 
 
 

 
Cicadettinae
Hemiptera tribes